Rasbora rutteni is a species of cyprinid fish in the genus Rasbora from Borneo.

References 

Rasboras
Freshwater fish of Borneo
Fish described in 1916
Taxa named by Lieven Ferdinand de Beaufort
Taxa named by Max Carl Wilhelm Weber